DAAI Mandarin (大愛與您分享 --- Da Ai Yu Nin Fen Xiang) is a Mandarin-language television news program that has been aired on Da Ai TV Indonesia since 3 August 2008.

The program was created to offer news to Mandarin speaking Chinese people living in Indonesia. It is on the 59th UHF Channel. The program highlights various themes such as social-humanitarianism, health, education, and acculturation of Chinese-Indonesian cultures. The program also aims at expanding viewers’ knowledge and providing a Mandarin learning device, enabling viewers to learn Mandarin through its shows.。

Program schedule 
 First run: Saturday at 18.00 WIB
 Re-run: Next Saturday at 12.30 WIB

See also 
 Tzu Chi
 Tzu Chi Malaysia
 Tzu Chi University

References

External links 
 Subscribe us on Youtube DAAI Mandarin
 Official websites of DAAI TV Indonesia
 Official websites of DAAI TV Taiwan

Indonesian television news shows
Mandarin Chinese
2008 Indonesian television series debuts
2010s Indonesian television series
2000s Indonesian television series
Tzu Chi
Buddhist media
Buddhist media in Taiwan